The Book of Swords can refer to two things:

Book of Swords, a 2002 martial arts film
Books of Swords, a series of fantasy novels written by Fred Saberhagen
The Book of Swords (anthology), a 2017 fantasy anthology collected by Gardner Dozois